Manuel Sistrunk (born June 16, 1947) is a former American football defensive lineman who played ten seasons in the National Football League.  He played college football for Arkansas AM&N (now known as the University of Arkansas at Pine Bluff) and was drafted in the fifth round of the 1970 NFL Draft.

He is a distant cousin to former NFL player Otis Sistrunk.

1947 births
Living people
American football defensive linemen
Arkansas–Pine Bluff Golden Lions football players
Washington Redskins players
Philadelphia Eagles players